Right to Public Services legislation in India comprises statutory laws which guarantee time bound delivery of services for various public services rendered by the Government to citizen and provides mechanism for punishing the errant public servant who is deficient in providing the service stipulated under the statute. Right to Service legislation are meant to reduce corruption among the government officials and to increase transparency and public accountability. Madhya Pradesh became the first state in India to enact Right to Service Act on 18 August 2010 and Bihar was the second to enact this bill on 25 July 2011. Several other states like Bihar, Delhi, Punjab, Rajasthan, Himachal Pradesh, Kerala, Uttarakhand, Haryana, Uttar Pradesh, Odisha, Jharkhand Maharashtra and West Bengal have introduced similar legislation for effectuating the right to service to the citizen.

Framework
The common framework of the legislations in various states includes, granting of "right to public services", which are to be provided to the public by the designated official within the stipulated time frame.  The public services which are to be granted as a right under the legislations are generally notified separately through Gazette notification. Some of the common public services which are to be provided within the fixed time frame as a right under the Acts, includes issuing caste, birth, marriage and domicile certificates, electric connections, voter's card, ration cards, copies of land records, etc.

On failure to provide the service by the designated officer within the given time or rejected to provide the service, the aggrieved person can approach the First Appellate Authority. The First Appellate Authority, after making a hearing, can accept or reject the appeal by making a written order stating the reasons for the order and intimate the same to the applicant, and can order the public servant to provide the service to the applicant.

An appeal can be made from the order of the First Appellate Authority to the Second Appellate Authority, who can either accept or reject the application, by making a written order stating the reasons for the order and intimate the same to the applicant, and can order the public servant to provide the service to the applicant or can impose penalty on the designated officer for deficiency of service without any reasonable cause, which can range from Rs. 500 to Rs. 5000 or may recommend disciplinary proceedings. The applicant may be compensated out of the penalty imposed on the officer. The appellate authorities has been granted certain powers of a Civil Court while trying a suit under Code of Civil Procedure, 1908, like production of documents and issuance of summon to the Designated officers and appellants.

Implementing states

References

External links
Punjab Right to Service Bill 2011
Bihar Right to Public Services Act, 2011
The Uttarakhand Right to Service Act, 2011
Himachal Pradesh Public Services Guarantee Act, 2011
Madhya Pradesh Lok Sewaon Ke Pradan Ki Guarantee Adhiniyam, 2010
Delhi (Right of Citizen to Time Bound Delivery of Services) Act, 2011
The Karnataka Guarantee of Services to Citizens Bill, 2011
The West Bengal Right to Public Services Bill, 2013
Summary of J&K Public Services Guarantee Act, 2011
 Odisha Right to Public Services Act, http://ortpsa.in

Indian legislation
Public services